USS Rudyerd Bay (CVE-81) was the twenty-seventh of fifty s built for the United States Navy during World War II. She was named after Rudyerd Bay, within Ketcchikan Gateway Bourough, of the Territory of Alaska. Today, the bay lies within Misty Fjords National Monument. The ship was launched in January 1944, commissioned in February, and served as a replenishment and transport carrier throughout the Mariana and Palau Islands campaign and the Philippines campaign. Later, she served as a frontline carrier, providing air cover and support for the invasion of Iwo Jima, and the Battle of Okinawa. Postwar, she participated in Operation Magic Carpet, repatriating U.S. servicemen from throughout the Pacific. She was decommissioned in June 1946, when she was mothballed in the Atlantic Reserve Fleet. Ultimately, she was sold for scrapping in January 1960.

Design and description

Rudyerd Bay was a Casablanca-class escort carrier, the most numerous type of aircraft carriers ever built, and designed specifically to be mass-produced using prefabricated sections, in order to replace heavy early war losses. She displaced  standard,  with a full load. She was powered with two Skinner Unaflow reciprocating steam engines, which drove two shafts, providing , thus enabling her to make . Power was provided by four Babcock & Wilcox water-tube boilers. Her compact size necessitated the installation of an aircraft catapult at her bow, and there were two aircraft elevators to facilitate movement of aircraft between the flight and hangar deck: one each fore and aft.

One /38 caliber dual-purpose gun was mounted on the stern. Anti-aircraft defense was provided by eight Bofors  anti-aircraft guns in single mounts, as well as 12 Oerlikon  cannons, which were mounted around the perimeter of the deck. By the end of the war, Casablanca-class carriers had been modified to carry thirty 20 mm cannons, and the amount of 40 mm guns had been doubled to sixteen, by putting them into twin mounts. These modifications were in response to increasing casualties due to kamikaze attacks. Although Casablanca-class escort carriers were designed to function with a crew of 860 and an embarked squadron of 50 to 56, the exigencies of wartime often necessitated the inflation of the crew count. Casablanca-class escort carriers were designed to carry 27 aircraft, but the hangar deck could accommodate more. During the Invasion of Iwo Jima, she carried 15 FM-2 fighters, 11 TBM-1C torpedo bombers,  and a TBM-1CP reconnaissance plane for a total of 27 aircraft. During the Battle of Okinawa, she carried 17 FM-2 fighters and 12 TBM-3 torpedo bombers, for a total of 29 aircraft.

Construction
Her construction was awarded to Kaiser Shipbuilding Company, Vancouver, Washington under a Maritime Commission contract, on 18 June 1942. The escort carrier was laid down on 24 October 1943 under the name Kaita Bay, as part of a tradition which named escort carriers after bays or sounds in Alaska. She was laid down as MC hull 1118, the twenty-seventh of a series of fifty Casablanca-class escort carriers. She was launched on 12 January 1944; sponsored by the wife of Captain Scott Ernest Peck; transferred to the United States Navy and commissioned on 25 February 1944, with Captain Curtis Stanton Smiley in command.

Service history

Upon being commissioned, Rudyerd Bay underwent a shakedown cruise down the West Coast to Southern California, where she took on a load of aircraft, which she ferried to Espiritu Santo of the New Hebrides throughout April and May. Upon returning to the West Coast, the carrier conducted qualification exercises off the California coast until July, before making another transport run to Majuro, in the Marshall Islands from 20 July to 26 July, escorted by the destroyer escort . After finishing her mission, she embarked Composite Squadron 77 (VC-77), departing on 8 August for the West Pacific. At Enewetak Atoll in the Marshall Islands, she joined Task Group 30.8, the Fleet Oiler and Transport Carrier Group, which at the time, consisted of seven escort carriers (including Rudyerd Bay), seven destroyers, fifteen destroyer escorts, and twenty-four replenishment oilers, organized into eight task units. She then proceeded with the task group to Manus Island, in the Admiralty Islands, arriving on 31 August.

Throughout early September, Rudyerd Bay served as a replenishment carrier, providing replacement aircraft (from VC-77), parts, and supplies for the frontline Fast Carrier Task Force of the Third Fleet, which at the time was supporting the Mariana and Palau Islands campaign. Later, during October, she continued supporting the fast carriers as they operated in support of the Philippines campaign. Rudyerd Bay was still a part of Task Group 30.8, now renamed the At Sea Logistics Group. The fleet oilers had been detached, and the number of escort carriers involved had increased to eleven. On 18 October, the carrier took on the wounded of the light cruiser , which had been subjected to two separate aerial torpedo hits. She transported them to Ulithi in the Caroline Islands, and by November, the carrier was back to replenishment duties, which would eventually take her into Typhoon Cobra.

On 17 December 1944, Rudyerd Bay was a part of Task Unit 30.8.12, alongside her sister , which was acting as the flagship. By then, the Third Fleet had been operating against positions on Luzon since 14 December, but its escorting destroyers ran low on fuel. As a result, the fleet retired to the east to refuel, and to receive replacement aircraft from Task Group 30.8. The location had been chosen because it lay out of range of Japanese fighters, but it also happened to lie within Typhoon Alley, where many Pacific tropical cyclones transited. As the escort carriers and the Third Fleet met, Typhoon Cobra began to bear down. At 01:00, fueling operations were attempted with the destroyers, although heavy winds and listing seas complicated the matter. At the same time, barometers on-board the ships began to drop, and tropical storm force winds were recorded.

As the weather continued to deteriorate, Admiral William Halsey Jr. ordered fueling operations suspended at 13:10. Two hours later, he instead ordered his fleet to proceed due southwards,  from where the fleet was located. This brought the fleet directly into the typhoon's core. To make matters worse for the Third Fleet, Halsey ordered the fleet to proceed northwards at 22:20, putting the fleet in the quadrant of the typhoon with the highest winds. Attached to the Third Fleet, Rudyerd Bay followed.

At 07:00, on the morning of 18 December, the fleet was inescapably trapped in the typhoon's path. Conflicting orders meant that some of the destroyers attempted to do some fueling during the morning, even as waves with an estimated height of  pounded the task force. At 07:22, Rudyerd Bay came to course at 60°, along with her sisters  and Nehenta Bay. Rudyerd Bay struggled to maintain its course as it battled with high winds and waves cresting over the flight deck. At 10:17, Rudyerd Bay radioed that she was dead in the water, albeit control was quickly regained.

Nonetheless, all appearances suggest that Rudyerd Bay passed through Typhoon Cobra relatively intact and without much damage, given the fact that on 19 December, Halsey found it judicious to assign upon her and her sister , the task of combing through the area looking for survivors. On 20 December, at 05:00, the carrier was the first to report to Halsey that the destroyer  had capsized, with the loss of most of its crew. At 08:40, Rudyerd Bay, along with her screens, relieved the destroyer escort , which had been conducting search and rescue operations for fifty straight hours.

Upon concluding rescue operations, Rudyerd Bay steamed back to Ulithi, where the destroyer escorts unloaded the survivors of the Spence. On 28 December, the escort carrier, accompanied by Nehenta Bay, several oilers, and various other ships, departed Ulithi, voyaging westwards to continue their replenishment role in support of the Philippines campaign. The carrier was situated in the Philippine Sea, until 10 January 1945, when she moved north to the South China Sea, in order to better support the fast carriers as they participated in the invasion of Lingayen Gulf and conducted strikes against Japanese shipping stretching from Indochina to Formosa. On 22 January, Rudyerd Bay left replenishment duty, transiting via the Sulu Sea, Mindanao Sea, and Leyte Gulf, before docking at Ulithi.

Rudyerd Bay remained at Ulithi until 10 February, when she left for Saipan, in the Mariana Islands, in preparation for the invasion of Iwo Jima. During this time period, Captain John Golden Foster Jr. took over command of the carrier. The two carriers were responsible for providing air cover and escorting the troop transports as they ferried marines to the shores of Iwo Jima. Finishing this duty without incident on 18 February, the two carriers joined Task Group 52.2, the Support Carrier Group, as a part of Task Unit 52.2.3, which was under the command of Rear Admiral George R. Henderson.

Rudyerd Bays aircraft contingent, VC-77, began flying missions in support of the marines on 19 February, as U.S. forces began touching down on the island's beaches. These missions were expected to include reconnaissance missions, flown by VC-77's sole TBM-1CP reconnaissance plane. However, after the plane had just taken off on its first mission, at 09:14, a scanty twelve minutes after the first U.S. forces had touched down on the island, the Avenger had a large Japanese shell tear into it, turning the plane into a fireball and killing VC-77's commanding officer. Nonetheless, VC-77 continued providing close air support and conducting antisubmarine patrols around Iwo Jima until 8 March, when Rudyerd Bay retired for Ulithi.

Whilst Rudyerd Bay was stationed at Ulithi from 11 March to 20 March, her aircraft contingent was exchanged, with Composite Squadron 96 (VC-96) being embarked in preparation for the Battle of Okinawa. On 21 March, the carrier got underway, as a part of Task Unit 52.1.2, which was under the command of Rear Admiral Felix Stump. Rudyerd Bays aircraft contingent, with the exceptions of 1 April and 8 April, operated daily until 17 April. From 13 to 15 April, VC-96 concentrated on the Sakishima Islands, where a squadron of Japanese kamikaze aircraft were being launched.

Throughout these operations, Rudyerd Bay witnessed a steady stream of both kamikazes and conventional Japanese aircraft make attacks on the escort carriers. For example, on the late afternoon of 2 April, Rudyerd Bays fighters were scrambled when two kamikazes attacked her sister , with an extreme near-miss tearing a large hole in the starboard side of the carrier. As the sun set, one of VC-96's fighters shot down a Mitsubishi A6M Zero, and as the Japanese planes disengaged, eight of her fighters were forced to make night landings, even though none of the pilots had been night-qualified. In the ensuing mayhem, two Wildcat fighters and an Avenger on the flight deck were rendered as complete losses, with four more planes being severely damaged, albeit remarkably, none of the pilots were killed or seriously injured.

On 17 April, Rudyerd Bay was rotated to Task Group 50.8, the Logistics Support Group, for a 10-day period of relative rest, although her aircraft were still responsible for providing an air screen for the replenishment carriers. She was rotated back to Task Group 52.1 on 27 April, whereupon she continued providing close air support. She was rotated again to Task Group 50.8 on 8 May, providing air cover until 20 May, when she retired from the Ryukyu Islands. By then, VC-96 had flown 1,257 sorties in support of the battle on Okinawa.

Proceeding eastwards, Rudyerd Bay arrived on Guam on 23 May, where she detached her aircraft contingent, VC-96, and embarked Composite Squadron 85 (VC-85) for transport back to the West Coast. Upon arriving back in the United States, she underwent overhaul, which took until the end of July. Upon the completion of overhaul, she was reassigned to plane ferry duty, which began on 1 August, when she ferried a load of aircraft from Naval Air Station Alameda to the Marshall Islands. Whilst she was still midway in her ferry mission, the Japanese surrender was announced. Nonetheless, Rudyerd Bay continued onwards, unloading cargo and passengers at Enewetak, before heading to Ulithi and the Philippines, and moving Composite Squadron (VC-33) to Okinawa. She then took on another aircraft squadron, which she transported back to the West Coast, arriving at San Francisco on 8 October.

There, Rudyerd Bay underwent repairs and modifications in order to better accommodate troops, before being assigned to the "Magic Carpet" fleet, which repatriated servicemen from throughout the Pacific. She made Magic Carpet runs for the rest of 1945, into the new year, finishing her final trans-Pacific run on 23 January 1946. On 18 February, she left dock at California, bound for the Eastern seaboard. She transited through the Panama Canal on 28 February, unloaded some aircraft at Jacksonville, Florida in early March, and steamed north to Boston, where inactivation work was commenced.

Rudyerd Bay was decommissioned on 11 June, and mothballed in the Atlantic Reserve Fleet, as part of its Boston group. Docked at the South Boston Naval Annex, she was reclassified as a utility carrier (CVU-81) on 12 June 1955. She was then further reclassified as an aviation transport (AKV-29) on 7 May 1959. She was struck from the Navy list on 1 August 1959, and sometime in January 1960, she was sold to Cantieri Navali Santa Maria, which broke her up in Genoa, Italy throughout 1960. Rudyerd Bay' received five battle stars for her World War II service.

References

Sources

Online sources

Bibliography

External links 

 

 

Casablanca-class escort carriers
World War II escort aircraft carriers of the United States
Ships built in Vancouver, Washington
1943 ships
S4-S2-BB3 ships